Bittium editum is a species of minute sea snail, a marine gastropod mollusc in the family Cerithiidae, the cerithiids. This species is found only in New Zealand.

References

 Powell A. W. B., New Zealand Mollusca, William Collins Publishers Ltd, Auckland, New Zealand 1979 

Cerithiidae
Gastropods of New Zealand
Gastropods described in 1930